Ester Capella i Farré (born 3 April 1963) is a Spanish lawyer and politician from Catalonia. She was the Minister of Justice of Catalonia in the Torra Cabinet. She was previously a member of the Congress of Deputies of Spain and Senate of Spain.

Born in 1968 in La Seu d'Urgell, Spain, Capella studied law at the University of Barcelona before becoming a lawyer. She was a municipal councillor in Barcelona from 2007 and 2011 and was appointed to the Senate of Spain in January 2013, serving until January 2016 when she became a member of the Congress of Deputies. She was appointed Minister of Justice of Catalonia in June 2018.

Early life
Capella was born on 3 April 1963 in La Seu d'Urgell, Catalonia. She grew up in La Pobla de Segur. She has a degree in law from the University of Barcelona.

Career
Capella started practising law in 1988. She is a member of the Bar Association of Barcelona. She was president of the Catalan Association of Democratic Lawyers (ACJD) from 2003 to 2007. She is a member of several feminist organisations including Women and Rights, the Women's Lobby of Catalonia and the Association of Women Jurists.

Capella contested the 2007 local elections as an independent Republican Left of Catalonia-Acord Municipal (ERC-AM) electoral alliance candidate in Barcelona and was elected. She joined ERC in 2008 and became the party's spokesperson on the city council. At the 2011 local elections Capella was placed third on the Unity for Barcelona–Republican Left of Catalonia–Reagrupament-Catalan Democracy-Acord Municipal (UpB-ERC-Ri.Cat-DCat-AM) alliance's list of candidates in Barcelona but the alliance only managed to win two seats in the municipality and as a result she failed to get re-elected. She was in charge of the Municipal Institute for People with Disabilities from 2011 to 2013.

In January 2013 Capella was appointed to the Senate of Spain by the Parliament of Catalonia, replacing Socialist Iolanda Pineda Balló. At the 2015 local elections Capella was placed 11th on the ERC-AM alliance's list of candidates in La Pobla de Segur but the alliance only managed to win six seats in the municipality and as a result she failed to get elected. She contested the 2015 general election as a Republican Left of Catalonia–Catalonia Yes (ERC–CatSí) candidate in the Province of Barcelona and was elected to the Congress of Deputies. She was re-elected at the 2016 general election.

On 19 May 2018 newly elected President Quim Torra nominated a new government in which Capella was to be Minister of Justice. She was sworn in on 2 June 2018 at the Palau de la Generalitat de Catalunya.

Electoral history

References

External links
 
 
 

1963 births
Barcelona municipal councillors
21st-century Spanish lawyers
Women politicians from Catalonia
Women lawyers from Catalonia
20th-century Spanish lawyers
Justice ministers of Catalonia
Living people
Members of the 11th Congress of Deputies (Spain)
Members of the 12th Congress of Deputies (Spain)
Members of the Senate of Spain
People from Pallars Jussà
Republican Left of Catalonia politicians
Torra Government
University of Barcelona alumni
Women members of the Congress of Deputies (Spain)